Todd Martin was the defending champion but did not compete that year.

Tim Henman won in the final 6–3, 6–1 against Carlos Moyá.

Seeds
A champion seed is indicated in bold text while text in italics indicates the round in which that seed was eliminated.

  Goran Ivanišević (semifinals)
  Wayne Ferreira (first round)
  Albert Costa (semifinals)
  Jan Siemerink (first round)
  Félix Mantilla (first round)
  Marc Rosset (first round)
  Petr Korda (first round)
  Paul Haarhuis (second round)

Draw

References
 1997 Sydney International Draw

Men's Singles
Singles